Sturisomatichthys frenatum is a species of armored catfish endemic to Ecuador where it occurs in rivers. This species grows to a length of  SL.

References

Sturisoma
Fish of South America
Freshwater fish of Ecuador
Fish described in 1902